Cruze Ah-Nau (born 10 August 1990) is an Australian rugby union footballer who plays as a prop. He plays for Zebre in the Pro 14 competition. He was a member of the Melbourne Rebels Super Rugby Extended Playing Squad. Ah-Nau was previously a member of the Western Force squad during the 2011 Super Rugby season although he didn't make any appearances. He then moved east in 2012 to join Norths in the Shute Shield.

Ah-Nau was a member of the Australia Under 20 team that competed in the 2010 IRB Junior World Championship.

On 13 September 2017, it was confirmed he joined Italian franchise Zebre in the Pro 14 prior to the 2017–18 season.

Super Rugby statistics

References

External links
 Melbourne Rebels profile

1990 births
Living people
Australian expatriate rugby union players
Australian people of Chinese descent
Australian people of Polish descent
Australian sportspeople of Samoan descent
Australian rugby union players
Expatriate rugby union players in Italy
Melbourne Rebels players
Melbourne Rising players
Rugby union players from Perth, Western Australia
Rugby union props
Western Force players
Zebre Parma players